The 1965 Ohio State Buckeyes football team represented the Ohio State University in the 1965 Big Ten Conference football season. The Buckeyes compiled a 7–2 record.

Schedule

Coaching staff
 Woody Hayes - Head Coach - 15th year

Game summaries

North Carolina

Washington

Illinois

Michigan State

Wisconsin

Minnesota

Indiana

Iowa

Michigan

1966 pro draftees

References

Ohio State
Ohio State Buckeyes football seasons
Ohio State Buckeyes football